"Flamboyant" is a song by English synth-pop duo Pet Shop Boys from their greatest hits album, PopArt: The Hits (2003). It was released on 29 March 2004 as the album's second and final single, reaching number nine in Spain, number 12 in the United Kingdom, and number 13 in Denmark.

The song was remixed for single release, and an extended mix of the original album version—dubbed the "Tomcraft Extended Mix"—was issued as one of the single's B-sides. The other B-side, "I Didn't Get Where I Am Today", features Johnny Marr on guitars. The single cover art contains the song title and the duo's name in katakana: . The single cover features Chris Lowe with long hair, which he sported for a short time.

Music video
The music video for "Flamboyant" was directed by Nico Beyer. Heavily based on aspects of Japanese popular culture, it tells the story of a Japanese office worker who aspires to appear on the television variety show Kasou Taishou, where guests perform silly stunts. He envisions a billiards-based routine, where he and others portray living balls on an enormous pool table. In the beginning of the video, scenes are of his unsupportive environment; his wife is annoyed at him, his manager scolds him for reading a billiards magazine at work, and his coworkers tease him at lunch. At the end of the video, however, he and his team perform their routine successfully on the show and win top ranking. The story footage is intercut with fake Japanese-style television commercials where the Pet Shop Boys offer various products such as an automatic ironing machine and a car called Boxy (Nissan Micra).

The video was finally released on DVD on the documentary A Life in Pop, although the disc does not mention the video's inclusion. Some territories, like Canada, do not feature the video.

Track listings
2-track CD
 "Flamboyant" (single mix)
 "I Didn't Get Where I Am Today"

Enhanced CD
 "Flamboyant" (Tomcraft extended mix)
 "Flamboyant" (Scissor Sisters silhouettes & shadows mix)
 "Flamboyant" (DJ Hell remix)
 "Flamboyant" (demo version)
 "Flamboyant" (Enhanced video)

Charts

References

2003 songs
2004 singles
Parlophone singles
Pet Shop Boys songs
Songs written by Chris Lowe
Songs written by Neil Tennant